Padilla  may refer to:

Places
 Padilla Municipality, Tamaulipas, in the Mexican state of Tamaulipas
 Padilla, Cauca, in Colombia
 Padilla, Bolivia
 Moises Padilla, Negros Occidental, in the Philippines
 Padilla Bay, in the U.S. state of Washington
 Padilla de Abajo, in Spain
 Padilla de Arriba, in Spain

Other uses
 Padilla (surname)
 Padilla v. Kentucky, a United States Supreme Court case pertaining to the immigration consequences faced by lawful permanent residents who are convicted of crimes, and their rights to be warned of those consequences
 Rumsfeld v. Padilla, a United States Supreme Court case pertaining to the War on Terror and defendant José Padilla
 Padilla (cigar brand), a brand of cigars launched in 2003 by Ernesto Padilla
 Padilla (spider), a genus of jumping spiders
 Almirante Padilla-class frigate, a class of four ships of the Colombian Navy